CrossCut Records is a German independent record label, that was created in 1981 specializing in blues and roots music.

Background
The CrossCut Mailorder service, a division of Bear Family Records, is one of the world's leading sources for blues and related music. In 2004 Bear Family and CrossCut merged their mail order branches.

Notable artists
Listed alphabetically by artist surname.

 Chris Cain
 John Campbell
 Bill Carter
 Otis Clay
 Ronnie Earl
 Terry Evans
 Mark Ford
 Robben Ford
 Dave Goodman, guitarist and singer/songwriter from Victoria B.C., Canada
 Hollywood Fats Band
 John Kay
 Pierre Lacocque
 Colin Linden
 Lee McBee

 Mighty Sam McClain
 R.J. Mischo
 Mississippi Heat
 John Mooney
 Charlie Musselwhite
 Shawn Pittman
 Sherman Robertson
 Jimmy Rogers
 Tom Shaka
 Little Smokey Smothers
 Dave Specter
 Luther Tucker
 Carl Weathersby
 Gary Wiggins

References

External links
 Official website

Record labels established in 1981
Defunct record labels of the United Kingdom
Rock record labels
Pop record labels
IFPI members